Parotis brunneomarginalis is a species of moth of the family Crambidae. It is found in Papua New Guinea.

It has a wingspan of 32mm.

References

External links
images at boldsystems.org

Moths described in 1907
Spilomelinae